The national symbols of Myanmar (also known as Burma) are icons, symbols and other cultural expressions which are seen as representative of the Burmese people. These have been accumulated over centuries and are mainly from the Bamar majority, while other ethnic groups also maintain their own symbols.

No official codification or de jure recognition exists, but most of these symbols are seen as de facto representative of the Burmese people. The use of much of these symbols were cultivated during the Konbaung dynasty which ruled the country from 1761 to 1885.

Flora 
The Burmese ascribe a flower to each of the twelve months of the traditional Burmese calendar. However, two flowers are seen as national symbols.

Fauna

Food 
A popular saying states "A thee hma, thayet; a thar hma, wet; a ywet hma, lahpet", translated as "of all the fruits, the mango's the best; of all the meats, the pork's the best; and of all the leaves, lahpet's (tea) the best".

Sport

Musical instruments

See also 
 Mythical creatures in Burmese folklore
 Burmese dance
 Cuisine of Myanmar
 Music of Myanmar
 Longyi

References